The Port Admiral Hotel is located on the corner of St Vincent Street and Commercial Road in the centre of Port Adelaide, South Australia.

History 

The Port Admiral Hotel was built by Robert Sanders and opened in 1849. The hotel was originally named the 'Railway Hotel' to reflect a proposed horse drawn train line. However, subsequent operator Charles Calton decided to rename it after a pub he had previously operated, giving the hotel its current name.

Restoration 
In 2006 the Port Admiral Hotel was closed by its operators. After extensive restoration and renovations the Hotel reopened in 2018. It is often referred to as a symbol of Port Adelaide's economic recovery.

References

Buildings and structures in Adelaide
Hotel buildings completed in 1849
Lefevre Peninsula